The demographics of Brussels are monitored by Statistics Belgium. Brussels population is currently 1,222,657 as of 2022.

Population 

The current population of Brussels (officially the Brussels Capital Region) in 2022 was 1,222,637 In recent years, the city has received a markable increase in its population. In general, the population of Brussels is younger than the national average, and the gap between rich and poor is wider.

Growth rate 
The population growth rate within Brussels for 2021 was 0.22%.

Density 

The density of Brussels is also high, Brussels is one of the most urbanised areas of Europe.

Life expectancy 
The life expectancy is Brussels is 79.61 years of age in 2020.

Fertility 
The total fertility rate within Brussels in 2019 is 1.7 children per woman. 

The total number of births in Brussels is declining.

Age of first birth and childbearing 
The average age of which a mother gives birth has been consistently rising since figures go back to 1998

Age 

The average age of Brussels is much lower than on average the rest of Belgium.

Language 

Today, the Brussels-Capital Region is legally bilingual, with both French and Dutch having official status, as is the administration of the 19 municipalities.

Owing to migration and to its international role, Brussels is home to a large number of native speakers of languages other than French or Dutch. Currently, about half of the population speaks a home language other than these two. In 2013, academic research showed that approximately 17% of families spoke none of the official languages in the home, while in a further 23% a foreign language was used alongside French. The share of unilingual French-speaking families had fallen to 38% and that of Dutch-speaking families to 5%, while the percentage of bilingual Dutch-French families reached 17%. At the same time, French remains widely spoken: in 2013, French was spoken "well to perfectly" by 88% of the population, while for Dutch this percentage was only 23% (down from 33% in 2000); the other most commonly known languages were English (30%), Arabic (18%), Spanish (9%), German (7%) and Italian and Turkish (5% each). Despite the rise of English as a second language in Brussels, including as an unofficial compromise language between French and Dutch, as well as the working language for some of its international businesses and institutions, French remains the lingua franca and all public services are conducted exclusively in French or Dutch.

Religion 
Historically, Brussels has been predominantly Roman Catholic, especially since the expulsion of Protestants in the 16th century. This is clear from the large number of historical churches in the region, particularly in the City of Brussels. The pre-eminent Catholic cathedral in Brussels is the Cathedral of St. Michael and St. Gudula, serving as the co-cathedral of the Archdiocese of Mechelen–Brussels. On the north-western side of the region, the National Basilica of the Sacred Heart is a Minor Basilica and parish church, as well as the 14th largest church building in the world. The Church of Our Lady of Laeken holds the tombs of many members of the Belgian Royal Family, including all the former Belgian monarchs, within the Royal Crypt.

In reflection of its multicultural makeup, Brussels hosts a variety of religious communities, as well as large numbers of atheists and agnostics. Minority faiths include Islam, Anglicanism, Eastern Orthodoxy, Judaism, and Buddhism. According to a 2016 survey, approximately 40% of residents of Brussels declared themselves Catholics (12% were practising Catholics and 28% were non-practising Catholics), 30% were non-religious, 23% were Muslim (19% practising, 4% non-practising), 3% were Protestants and 4% were of another religion.

As guaranteed by Belgian law, recognised religions and non-religious philosophical organisations enjoy public funding and school courses. It was once the case that every pupil in an official school from 6 years old to 18 had to choose 2 hours per week of compulsory religious—or non-religious-inspired morals—courses. However, in 2015, the Belgian Constitutional court ruled religious studies could no longer be required in the primary and secondary educational systems.

Brussels has a large concentration of Muslims, mostly of Moroccan, Turkish, Syrian and Guinean ancestry. The Great Mosque of Brussels, located in the Parc du Cinquantenaire/Jubelpark, is the oldest mosque in Brussels. Belgium does not collect statistics by ethnic background or religious beliefs, so exact figures are unknown. It was estimated that, in 2005, people of Muslim background living in the Brussels Region numbered 256,220 and accounted for 25.5% of the city's population, a much higher concentration than those of the other regions of Belgium.

Origin 

Belgium does not collect ethnic data of its citizens but does have a unique classification on the status of where its citizens originate from. This classification is not based on the place of birth, but takes into account previous nationalities of the person and of their parents.

In 2021, only 25% of the residents of Brussels were of Belgian origin (i.e., the resident had no previous nationality other than Belgian and both of their parents have the Belgian nationality as first nationality), and 75% were of overall foreign origin. Of these foreign origin residents, 41.8% were of non-European origin and 28.7% were of African origin.

Among those aged under 18, 88% were of foreign origin and 57% of non-European origin (including 42.4% of African origin).

References 

Brussels
Brussels
Brussels